Edward Lewis Best (4 May 1874 – 31 July 1957) was an Australian rules footballer who played with Fitzroy in the Victorian Football League (VFL).

Notes

External links 

1874 births
1957 deaths
Australian rules footballers from Victoria (Australia)
Fitzroy Football Club players